Mulligan Peak is an ice-free peak 1 nautical mile (1.9 km) north of Robison Peak, at the north end of Willett Range in Victoria Land. Named by Advisory Committee on Antarctic Names (US-ACAN) for John J. Mulligan of the U.S. Bureau of Mines, who scaled this peak and the peak to the south of it during December 1960 and found coal beds and fossil wood.

Mountains of Victoria Land
Scott Coast
Willett Range